= Zacatecas, Mexico =

Zacatecas, Mexico, may refer to:

- Zacatecas, one of the states of Mexico
- Zacatecas City, capital city of that state
